Nine Stones may refer to:
Nine Stones, Altarnun, a prehistoric monument on Bodmin Moor, Cornwall, England
Nine Stones, Winterbourne Abbas, a prehistoric monument in Dorset, England
Nine Stones Close, a prehistoric monument in Derbyshire, England
Ninestane Rig, a prehistoric monument in the Scottish Borders
Boskednan stone circle, a prehistoric monument near Penzance, Cornwall, England